Teboho Moloi  (born 2 July 1968) is a retired South African professional footballer and manager of the South Africa U-17 national team.

Club career
Moloi spent most of his career playing as a midfielder for Orlando Pirates. He had a spell with Gaziantepspor in the Turkish Super Lig during the 1993-94 season and a spell with Once Caldas in 1995 and 1996, where he became the first South African to score a goal in the Colombian top flight.

International career
Moloi appeared in two matches for the senior South Africa national football team during 1993.

References

External links
 
 Teboho Moloi at Footballdatabase

1968 births
Living people
South African soccer players
South Africa international soccer players
South African expatriate soccer players
Orlando Pirates F.C. players
Gaziantepspor footballers
Once Caldas footballers
Süper Lig players
Expatriate footballers in Turkey
Sportspeople from Soweto
Association football midfielders